Prestatyn North is the name of one of the electoral wards of the town of Prestatyn, Denbighshire, Wales. It covers the northwest part of the town, either side of Victoria Road close to the beach. Prestatyn East ward lies to the east, while Rhyl East lies to the west.

According to the 2011 UK Census the population of the ward was 5,716 (with 4,624 of voting age).

County council elections
The ward elects three county councillors to Denbighshire County Council and, at the May 2017 election, the seats were won by two Welsh Conservative candidates and one from Welsh Labour. In the past the ward has changed hands between Labour (who held the ward between 2012 and 2017), Conservatives and Independent councillors.

Prestatyn North became newsworthy in May 2012 when two candidates with similar names, Labour candidate Paul Penlington and Conservative Allan Pennington, were mixed up by the returning officer. A block of Penlington's votes were allocated to Pennington in error, with the latter being declared winner of the third council seat. Losing independent councillor, Mike German, demanded the election be re-run. After a costly legal dispute in the High Court, Penlington took his rightful seat, on 14 February 2013. All three seats were then held by the Welsh Labour Party.

Prestatyn Town Council
For elections to Prestatyn Town Council the town is divided into six wards, with Prestatyn North county ward being subdivided into North and North West. Five of the eighteen town councillors are elected from the North and North West wards.

See also
 List of places in Denbighshire (categorised)

References

Prestatyn
Wards of Denbighshire